The Haagse Poort is an office building in The Hague, Netherlands. It is an unusual, asymmetrical structure of 275 meters (or 900 feet) long that spans the Utrechtsebaan with a large arch. The Haagse Poort consists of a high-rise part and a low-rise part that are connected by the arch from the eighth floor. The tallest part amounts 70 meters (or 230 feet) and 17 floors. The building offers approximately 108,000 m2 (or 1,160,000 sq ft) of office space.

References 

Buildings and structures in The Hague
Office buildings completed in 1994
1994 establishments in the Netherlands
20th-century architecture in the Netherlands